Jennifer Nicole Mascia (born November 22, 1977, in Miami) is an American writer. She is the author of Never Tell Our Business to Strangers (2010) and a writer at The Trace. Until June 10, 2014, she was a regular contributor to The Gun Report, a gun violence project spearheaded by the Op-Ed columnist Joe Nocera.

Mascia is a graduate of City University of New York's Hunter College and Columbia University’s Graduate School of Journalism
.

In February 2010, Mascia published Never Tell Our Business to Strangers, a memoir about her parents that centers around the discovery of her father's murder conviction. The memoir is an expansion of a Modern Love column published in the Times on April 1, 2007.

References

1977 births
Living people
Hunter College alumni
Columbia University Graduate School of Journalism alumni
The New York Times writers
American writers of Italian descent
American people of Russian descent
Writers from Miami
21st-century American journalists
American memoirists
American women memoirists
21st-century American women